Syed Rizwan Wasti (1937 – January 24, 2011) was a Radio Pakistan, Karachi's radio news broadcaster and a film and television actor.

Early life
Rizwan Wasti was born in 1937 at Lahore but his family later moved to Karachi where he received his Bachelor of Law degree from Sindh Muslim Law College in Karachi.

Career
He first worked for Radio Pakistan as an English news broadcaster in the 1953 at age sixteen making made him the youngest newscaster of the sub-continent where he initially learned how to use and control his voice for news media broadcasts. He worked at Radio Pakistan for sixteen years.  Then he moved on to acting in the Pakistani television drama serials in the late 1960s, 1970s, 1980s and 1990s and played over 200 various different roles in dramas such as Afshan, Shaheen and Khuda Ki Basti. A noted TV actor Talat Hussain commented after his death, "He was a distinguished name in the broadcasting world, a man who had his own distinct style."

Personal life
He was also a banker by profession and he worked as a vice president at National Bank of Pakistan later he took retirement in 1996.  He was married to TV actress Tahira Wasti and had three children including two sons and actress Laila Wasti is his daughter. Maria Wasti a famous television actress is his niece.

Illness and death
Rizwan Wasti had prolonged illness from which he died on 24 January 2011 at age 73. He was laid to rest at the Gizri graveyard in DHA.

Filmography

Television series
 Khuda Ki Basti (1969-1974)
 Shama (TV drama serial), as 'Judge Akhtar Hussain'
 Afshan (TV drama serial)
 Ana
 Aabgeenay (TV drama serial) 
 Kali Deemak
 Aagahi (TV drama serial)
 Hasina-E Alam
 Eid Flight
 Aik Raat
 StarNite
 Tabeer
 Gurez
 Kashkol
 Eaitraf
 Usay Bhool Ja
 Madan-e-Mohabbat
 Aa Mere Pyar ki Khusboo
 Aroosa
 Shaheen
 Aawazain
 Tipu Sultan: The Tiger Lord
 Jinnah Se Quaid
 Ghazi Shaheed
 Chai Time Aka Tea Time

Telefilm
 Operation Dwarka 1965

Film
 Lap of Actress (TV Film)
 Insaf Aur Qanoon

Bibliography
Rizwan authored a critically book titled Sher Shah Suri about the Afghan general and he also wrote a book of poems called A chorus of echoes.

References

External links 
 

1937 births
20th-century Pakistani male actors
2011 deaths
Pakistani male film actors
Pakistani television newsreaders and news presenters
Pakistani male television actors
Pakistani radio presenters
Pakistani broadcasters
Punjabi people
Radio personalities from Karachi
St. Patrick's High School, Karachi alumni
21st-century Pakistani male actors